Susan Taylor could refer to:

Susan L. Taylor (born 1946), American journalist and former editor-in-chief of Essence magazine
Susan S. Taylor (born 1942), American biochemist
Sue Taylor, British-Australian journalist and television producer
Taylor Pie aka Susan Taylor (born 1947), American folk singer